Goodson is an English surname. Notable people with the surname include:

Adrienne Goodson (born 1966), American basketball player
Alfred Goodson (1867-1940), British businessman and public servant
Barbara Goodson (born 1949), American voice actress
Clarence Goodson (born 1982), American soccer player
Don Goodson (1932–2010), English cricketer
Ed Goodson (born 1948), American baseball player
Ida Goodson (1909–2000), American classic female blues and jazz singer and pianist
Ivor Goodson (born 1943), British educationalist
Jonathan Goodson (born 1945), American television producer 
Katharine Goodson (1872-1958), English pianist
Len Goodson (1880−1922), English footballer
Mark Goodson (1915–1992), American television producer
Patricia Goodson, American concert pianist
Tyler Goodson (born 2000), American football player
William Goodsonn (1610–), English vice-admiral in the Royal Navy

Fictional characters
Joel Goodson, fictional character in the film Risky Business, played by Tom Cruise

See also
Charles Goodson-Wickes (born 1945), British politician
Patricia Timmons-Goodson (born 1954), American judge

English-language surnames